Carlisle Crown Street railway station served the city of Carlisle, in the historical county of Cumberland, England, from 1844 to 1849 on the Maryport and Carlisle Railway.

History 
The station was opened on 30 December 1844 by the Maryport and Carlisle Railway. It replaced Carlisle Water Street station, which opened a year earlier.

References 

Disused railway stations in Cumbria
Railway stations in Great Britain opened in 1844
Railway stations in Great Britain closed in 1849
1844 establishments in England
1849 disestablishments in England